The Wołpa Synagogue was a synagogue located in the town of Voŭpa, in what is now western Belarus.   It was reputed to be the "most beautiful" of the wooden synagogues of the former Polish–Lithuanian Commonwealth, a "masterwork" of wooden vernacular architecture.

History

The synagogue was built in the first half of the eighteenth century, and altered in minor ways several times.  In 1929 the building was listed as a Polish Monument of Culture.  It was burnt by the Germans during the Second World War.

Architecture

The main hall was 13 meters by 12.80 meters with a vaulted ceiling described by art historians Maria and Kazimierz Piechotka as having been "the most magnificent of all known wooden ceilings" in Europe. Of course, since Christians were free to build with brick and stone, few European buildings of the scale of the Wolpa synagogue were ever built in wood. The walls of the main hall were 7.2 meters high. The vaulting, under a three-tiered roof, rose to a height of fourteen meters in three tiers marked by fancy balustrades. Each tier was made up of several curving sections faced in wooden paneling to form a graceful, tiered and vaulted dome. The vaulted ceiling was supported by the four wooden corner columns that rose from the bimah, and by trusses in the roof.

The Torah Ark was an elaborate, multi-tiered confection in painted, carved wood, with columns, bas-relief menorahs, vases, floral swags, roofed towers, the tablets of the Ten Commandments and an eagle.

In the early nineteenth century, the vaulted ceiling was painted in a "dark sapphire" color spangled with "glistening" gold stars.  The walls were painted in naive Trompe-l'œil style to resemble a Classical masonry building. Polish Jewish communities were routinely denied permission to build in masonry.

The exterior featured a three-tiered roof and a pair of elaborate corner pavilions with two-tiered roofs over elaborate vaulted ceilings.

In 1997, the Yiddish Book Center on the campus of Hampshire College in Amherst, Massachusetts, the world's largest repository of Yiddish books and literature, chose to model its building on existing photographs of the Wolpa Synagogue.

In 2015, an exact replica of Wolpa Synagogue was built in Biłgoraj, Poland.

References

External links 

 The synagogue of Wołpa,  Virtual Shtetl 2010
 Wooden Synagogue in Voupa (Volpa, Wołpa), Belarus in the Bezalel Narkiss Index of JEwish Art, the Center for Jewish Art, the Hebrew University of Jerusalem

Wooden synagogues
Synagogues in Belarus
18th-century synagogues